Rugby Union in Mali is a minor but growing sport.

Governing body
The governing body for the sport is the Fédération Malienne de Rugby (Malienne Rugby Federation).

History
Mali was formerly a French colony, and the game was first introduced there by French expatriates. In recent years, the game has been played mostly by native Malians.

Mali has a long-established union and players come from all walks of life.

See also
 Mali national rugby union team 
 Confederation of African Rugby
 Africa Cup

External links
 IRB Mali page 
 CAR
 Mali to host African U-18 Rugby Championship
 Niger retain Africa CAR Development Trophy
 Archives du Rugby: Mali

References

 
Sport in Mali